This page shows the results of the Diving Competition for men and women at the 1971 Pan American Games, held from July 30 to August 13, 1971 in Cali, Colombia. There were two events, for both men and women.

Men's competition

3m Springboard

10m Platform

Women's competition

3m Springboard

10m Platform

Medal table

See also
 Diving at the 1972 Summer Olympics

References
 Sports 123

1971
1971 Pan American Games
1971 in diving